The Championship Cup, (known as the Northern Rail Cup for sponsorship reasons), and previously known as the National League Cup, was a rugby league football competition for clubs in the United Kingdom's Rugby League Championships. Although the French club Toulouse Olympique competed in the Championship from 2009 through 2011, they never participated in the cup until 2012 after they had left the Championship. The Cup's last season was 2013, after which it was replaced by the 1895 Cup.

History
The Trans-Pennine Cup was a short-lived competition for professional British rugby league clubs outside Super League. It was played for during the period in which all non-Super League professional clubs were grouped into a single competition, the Northern Ford Premiership.

As part of the redevelopment of the Northern Ford Premiership competition; the National League cup was first held in 2002. It was known as the Buddies Cup, after its sponsor, a soft drinks manufacturer. Eighteen teams took part divided into three groups of six (East, West and Central).

The Northern Ford Premiership was replaced by National Leagues One and Two in 2003. The competition was known as the Arriva Trains Cup after sponsor Arriva Trains Northern). The twenty National League teams were divided into four groups (North, East, West and Central) of five teams each, while in 2004 there were five groups (North, East, West, Pennine, Yorkshire) of four teams each.

Northern Rail became the competition's sponsor in 2005 and the name Northern Rail Cup was adopted. Four teams from the then National League Three also entered the competition. There were no cross-group games in the 2005 competition; each team therefore played only six games in the group stages, with the top team from each of the first five groups progressing to the quarter-final directly. The second-placed team in each of these groups, plus the top team from group six (the group of teams from National League 3) played an additional round to determine the remaining three spots in the quarter-finals.

For 2006 there were seven groups. Groups one to six comprised the 22 teams in National Leagues One and Two and the two southern National League Three teams, Hemel Stags and St Albans Centurions. There were four teams in each regional division. The top two teams from groups one to six and the best three third-placed teams qualified for the last sixteen knock out stage along with the winner of group seven. Group seven comprised northern National League Three teams that choose to enter, and included three teams: Bramley Buffaloes, Warrington Wizards and Dewsbury Celtic.

In 2007 the competition adopted a new points system: Win – three points; Draw – two points; Loss by 12 points or fewer – one point.

In 2009, the Northern Rail Nines tournament was started. Teams not involved in the Northern Rail Cup Final entered a rugby league nines event with the trophy and plate final played as curtain raisers to the Northern Rail Cup Final at Bloomfield Road, Blackpool.

Venues

Results

Winners

Championship Bowl

Sponsors

Records
Below is a list of National League Cup records.

Most tries
 5 Paul Salmon (Barrow Raiders) vs Workington Town 2002
 5 Neil Turley (Leigh Centurions) vs Swinton Lions 2003
 5 Neil Turley (Leigh Centurions) vs Chorley Lynx 2004
 5 Jon Steel (Hull Kingston Rovers) vs London Skolars 2005
 5 Byron Ford (Hull Kingston Rovers) vs York City Knights 2006

Most goals
 Gareth Moore (Batley Bulldogs) vs Gateshead Thunder 2010

Most goals in a final
 10 John Wilshere (Salford City Reds) vs Doncaster 2008 equaling the all-time record for goals kicked in any final

Most points
 42 (5 tries, 11 goals) Neil Turley (Leigh Centurions) at Chorley Lynx 2004

Highest score
 Gateshead Thunder 4 vs 100 Batley Bulldogs – 2010

Highest away score
 Gateshead Thunder 4 vs 100 Batley Bulldogs – 2010

Closest score
 Batley Bulldogs 25 vs Widnes Vikings 24 – 2010

Most Final appearances (Club)
 Leigh Centurions have contested 5 Championship Cup Finals.

Most Competition Wins (Club)
 Leigh Centurions have won 4 Championship Cup Finals, from 5 final appearances.

Broadcasting rights
Sky Sports broadcast a limited number of Championship Cup matches. In 2012 the rights passed to Premier Sports. Setanta Sports Australia broadcast live Northern Rail Cup matches in Australia.

See also
 2005 Northern Rail Cup
 2010 National League Cup
 Co-operative Championship
 Northern Rail Nines
 RFL League 1
 Rugby Football League Championship Second Division
 Rugby League Challenge Cup
 Trans-Pennine Cup

References

External links
 Official competition website
 Fixture List for 2007 Season
 Results for 2007 Season
 Tables for 2007 Season
 Scores from Sky Sports

 
Rugby league competitions in the United Kingdom
Sports leagues established in 2002
Sports leagues disestablished in 2013
2002 establishments in England
2013 disestablishments in England